Basketball events were contested at the 1987 Summer Universiade in Zagreb, Yugoslavia.

References
 Universiade basketball medalists on HickokSports

Universaiie
1987 Summer Universiade
1987
Univ
Universiade
1987–88 in Yugoslav basketball